The Daily Courier is an American, English language newspaper published in Forest City, North Carolina, owned by the Paxton Media Group.

The Daily Courier publishes both print and online editions Tuesday through Friday and Sunday, featuring local news, sports, entertainment and opinions. It started in 1969 as This Week, a weekly publication, and switched to daily publication in 1978. The Daily Courier has a circulation base of more than 6,800

See also
 List of newspapers in North Carolina

References

External links 
 

Publications established in 1969
Rutherford County, North Carolina
Daily newspapers published in North Carolina
1969 establishments in North Carolina